Castrilanthemum is a genus of flowering plants belonging to the family Asteraceae. It contains a single species, Castrilanthemum debeauxii.

Its native range is Spain.

References

Anthemideae
Monotypic Asteraceae genera